Mindtrap is a computer game. 

Mindtrap may also refer to:

 MindTrap, a series of lateral thinking board games
 Cour'souvra, a fictional device in the Wheel of Time series